The Bravery Council of Australia Meeting 69 Honours List was announced by the Governor General of Australia, Major General Michael Jeffery,  on 25 August 2008.

Awards were announced for 
the Bravery Medal and
Commendation for Brave Conduct.

† indicates an award made posthumously.

Bravery Medal (BM)

 Tony Paul Aubeck
 Victor Douglas Batson
 Richard Anthony Cooper
 Constable David James Crawford, New South Wales Police
 Samir El Haouli
 Terry Barry Goodman
 Ian Peter Gunn
 Henry Hill
 Fergus Butle Jackson
 Martin James Langham
 Benjamin John Lee
 Tu-Vinh Ly †
 Patrick Ray Morgan
 Andrew John Mortimer
 Trevor Richard Oliver
 Billel Ouaida
 Master Ibrahim Ouaida †
 John Percival Partridge
 Glen Richard Pickford
 Brian David Smith
 Senior Constable Paul Smith, New South Wales Police
 Senior Constable Paul Thompson, New South Wales Police

Commendation for Brave Conduct

 Amme Louisa Batson
 Senior Constable David Brooker, New South Wales Police
 Patrick Richard Byrne
 Roger Roy Cullinan
 Michael John Greentree
 Tommy Raymon Hair
 Senior Constable Michael Douglas McCormack, New South Wales Police
 Maria Ivy Mangcoy
 Thomas Mitchell †
 Brett Edward Nicholls
 Joel Leslie Poole
 James Rivers
 Elias Touma Rizkalla
 Constable Robert Lawrence Sasagi, New South Wales Police
 Sergeant Christopher Daniel Shaw, Queensland Police
 John Miller Sim
 Michael Jason Thompson
 John Andrew Timos

References

Orders, decorations, and medals of Australia
2008 awards in Australia